William Thorn Simpson (August 1886 – December 8, 1980) was an American lawyer and politician from New York.

Life
Simpson was born in Patchogue, New York, and graduated from Patchogue High School and New York Law School. He was married to Helen V. Simpson.

He was a member of the New York State Assembly (Kings Co., 12th D.) in 1914, 1915, 1916 and 1917.

Simpson was again a member of the State Assembly in 1920; and a member of the New York State Senate (6th D.) in 1921 and 1922.

In June 1942, he was appointed as Chairman of the New York State War Ballot Commission.

He died on December 8, 1980, at the St. James Nursing Home in St. James, New York; and was buried at the Cedar Grove Cemetery in Patchogue.

Sources
 New York Red Book (1917; pg. 190)
 GUIDE FOR VOTERS BY CITIZENS UNION in NYT on October 28, 1917
 HEADS WAR BALLOT AGENCY in NYT on June 13, 1942 (subscription required)
 William T. Simpson, 94, Is Dead in NYT on December 11, 1980 (subscription required)

External links
 

1886 births
1980 deaths
Republican Party New York (state) state senators
Politicians from Brooklyn
New York Law School alumni
Republican Party members of the New York State Assembly
People from Patchogue, New York
People from St. James, New York
20th-century American politicians